Zinc finger protein 267 is a protein that in humans is encoded by the ZNF267 gene.

References

Further reading

External links 
 
 
 

Transcription factors